Semla (also Saimla) is a village under Hasanpur tehsil of Amroha district. In older times it was known by the name of Samargarh. It is said by the old of the village that the earthen pots of various types and colours were found when the earth was dug for setting up the pumping sets around the village. Those earthen pots are believed to have been of some old civilization. It has a population of about 800. This is a totally Hindu-populated village. The dominating caste of the village is Chauhan Rajput who belong to Kshtriya class of Hindus. Remaining population belong to Scheduled Caste. Half of the population is literate. Women are less literate. The village is reached via Hasanpur (35 km away) or Gajraula. The village is located near Sambhal, where it is believed that next incarnation of Lord Vishnu named "Kalki" will take place.

Villages in Amroha district